Jane Poitras may refer to:
Jane Ash Poitras (born 1951), Canadian artist and printmaker
Jane Cowell-Poitras (born 1953), Canadian politician